Avotakka is a monthly Finnish interior design magazine published in Helsinki, Finland.

History and profile
Avotakka was first published in December 1967. In 1971 it merged with an older Finnish design magazine Kaunis koti [Finnish: Beautiful Home], which had first been published in 1948. At the time, the merger represented the combination of a more middle- and professional class magazine (Kaunis koti) with a more populist magazine (Avotakka). The owner and publisher is A-lehdet Oy and the headquarters of the magazine is in Helsinki. It is published on a monthly basis.

As of 2011 the editor-in-chief of the magazine was Soili Ukkola.

Circulation
In 2005 the annual circulation of Avotakka was 88,193 copies. Its circulation was 85,000 copies in 2007. In 2010 the magazine had a circulation of 85,104 copies. The 2011 circulation of the magazine was 85,431 copies. It fell to 82,245 copies in 2012 and to 71,911 copies in 2013.

See also
List of Finnish magazines

References

External links
 Official website

1967 establishments in Finland
Design magazines
Finnish-language magazines
Magazines established in 1967
Magazines published in Helsinki
Monthly magazines published in Finland